Iranian pop music or Persian pop music refers to pop music originated in Iran, with songs mainly in Persian and other regional Persian dialects of the country and region.

History

Early Iranian popular music
Following the invention of radio in 1930, and after World War II, a form of popular music emerged and began to develop in Iran.

1950s–70s
Iran's western-influenced pop music emerged by the 1950s. Prior to the 1950s, Iran's music industry was dominated by traditional singers. Viguen, known as the "Sultan" of Iranian pop and jazz music, was a pioneer of this revolution. He was one of Iran's first musicians to perform with a guitar.

Some of Iran's classical pop artists include Andy, Aref, Dariush, Ebi, Faramarz Aslani, Farhad, Fereydun Farrokhzad, Giti Pashaei, Googoosh, Hassan Shamaizadeh, Haydeh, Homeyra, Leila Forouhar, Mahasti, Nooshafarin, Parviz Maghsadi, Ramesh, Shahram Shabpareh, and Varoujan.

After the 1979 Revolution
After the 1979 Revolution, pop music was banned and completely disappeared from the scene in Iran. Many Iranians emigrated to foreign countries, especially to Los Angeles in the United States, and many continued to sing in exile. Since then, several popular Iranian TV channels and radio stations operate outside the country, aired through various satellites. These broadcast companies play an important role in promoting and connecting Iranian pop artists to Iranians living all over the world.

In the 1990s, officials of the new government decided to produce and promote a "decent" pop music, in order to compete with the abroad and unofficial sources of Iranian music. Ali Moallem (poet) and Fereydoun Shahbazian (musician) headed a council at the IRIB that supervised the revival of domestic pop music.

Shadmehr Aghili was one of the first post-revolutionary Iranian singers who received significant support, including promotion by national television, to produce new Persian pop songs inside Iran. He was highly skilled at playing violin and guitar, and was a very talented singer. He became a very successful and popular musician and singer in Iran, but eventually immigrated to Canada and then moved to Los Angeles, continuing his career outside Iran.

Under the presidency of Khatami, as a result of easing cultural restrictions within Iran, a number of new pop singers emerged from within the country. Since the new administration took office, the Ministry of Ershad adopted a different policy, mainly to make it easier to monitor the industry. The newly adopted policy included loosening restrictions for a small number of artists, while tightening it for the rest. However, the number of album releases increased.

Arian, the first officially sanctioned pop music band with female singers in post-revolutionary Iran, started a new chapter of Iranian pop music. They had a cooperation with the well-known British-Irish singer Chris de Burgh in their fourth album Bi to, Ba to, and were the first Iranian band to be featured in the English biographical dictionary and directory of International Who's Who in Music.

in 2001 some of the young artists create a movement called Iranian hip hop their music was inspired by American hip hop artists like Eminem or Tupac and at the beginning government bans this genre of music but artists like zedbazi, hichkas,  reza pishro and many other tries to make hip hop music until this day hip hop genre artist cant sell an album cant make the concert but this movement still alive and new artists like epicure, wantons, hamid sefat, and ali sorena keep this big movement alive, also in Iran governments rules the Persian rock music is forbidden too

In late 2009, Sirvan Khosravi became the first domestic Iranian artist to achieve high-rotation airplay on a regular European radio station. He made his debut with the song Saat-e 9 ("9 O'Clock"), which also made headlines in Iranian online media. In August 2010, Farzad Farzin Amin Rostami made his debut European chart with the song Chike Chike ("Trickle Trickle") from his third legal album Shans ("Chance").

after 2010

Awards

Notable International Awards
 1971: Googoosh, first prize and golden record at the MIDEM in Cannes, for her 7th record (as Gougoush) featuring two songs in French:"Retour de la Ville" (A-side) and "J'entends Crier Je T'aime" (B-side).
 1972: Googoosh, first prize at the Carthage Music Festival.
 1972: Googoosh, first medal of arts of Tunisia.
 1973: Googoosh, participated at the Sanremo Music Festival.
 2002: Deep Dish, Grammy Award winner for Best Remixed Recording, for Dido's "Thank You".
 2006: Andy Madadian, Best Middle Eastern Song & Best Middle Eastern Album at the JPF Awards.
 2013: Farzad Farzin, Best Song and Performance at the Art-football Festival.

See also
 Music of Iran
 List of Iranian musicians

References

 https://www.vice.com/en/article/yw59y7/rap-is-banned-in-iran-but-the-underground-scene-is-flourishing

 
Pop music by country